Goryachiye Klyuchi is the name of several rural localities in Sakhalin Oblast, Russia:
Goryachiye Klyuchi, Kurilsky District, Sakhalin Oblast, a selo in Kurilsky District
Goryachiye Klyuchi, Nogliksky District, Sakhalin Oblast, a selo in Nogliksky District